In Thailand, the two-baht coin is the coin which is worth 2 baht or 200 satang. The new 2-baht coin design features H.M. King Bhumibol Adulyadej, the Great on the obverse, like all other Thai legal tender coins presently in circulation. The reverse design depicts the Golden Mountain at Wat Saket Ratcha Wora Maha Wihan in Bangkok.

Before the two-baht coin entered into circulation, this denomination was used as a commemorative coin since 1979. As of 1996, there is one cupronickel and forty cupronickel-clad-copper commemorative coin series.

On September 15, 2005, the Royal Thai Mint began minting two-baht coins to complete the binary system in Thailand's coinage.  That is, each successive denomination is worth twice, or roughly twice, as much as the previous one. Thai coin denominations in general circulation are now 25 satang, 50 satang, 1 baht, 2 baht, 5 baht, and 10 baht.

Recent statistics show that the one-baht coins constitute about 60% of the total coin circulation in the Thai economy. According to the Treasury Department, the issuance of the two-baht coins will solve the overwhelming demand for the one-baht coins as the two-baht coins now fill the gap between the one- and five-baht coins. This translates into savings in time and materials for the mint. The mint is considering expanding the use of multi-ply plated steel technology to other coin denominations due to volatile base metal prices and rising production costs.

On February 3, 2009, the Royal Thai Mint released the new series two-baht coin, minted in 2008, which uses aluminium bronze in place of the former nickel-clad low-carbon steel.

2005-2007 two-baht coin 
The original two-baht coin was minted 2005-2007, and was the sole two-baht coin in circulation from 2005 until February 3, 2009, when the new design was released. The old design will not be removed from circulation.

The obverse was designed by Mrs Phutthachat Arunwet, and sculpted by Mr Panya Khamkhen. The reverse was designed by Mr Chaiyod Soontrapa, and sculpted by Mr Thammanun Kaeosawang. The same designer created the artwork of the reverse on the new two-baht coin, and the artwork is similar, but not identical.

Mintages 
 2005 ~ 60,000,000
 2006 ~ 107,872,500
 2007 ~ 232,105,100 (old series)
 2008 ~ 10,004,000 (new series)
 2009 ~ 50,370 (old series)
 2009 ~ 244,741,000 (new series)
 2009 ~ 137,228,000

Commemorative issues

Cupronickel coin 
 Commemoration of Princess Chulabhorn Walailak graduating from Kasetsart University

Cupronickel-clad copper coin 
 Commemoration of the International Year of Youth
 the 13th SEA Games
 Commemoration of the International Year of Trees
 Commemoration of the International Year of Peace
 the 5th cycle birthday of King Bhumipol Adulyadej
 Commemoration of Rajamagalapisek Royal Ceremony
 the centenary of Chulachomklao Royal Military Academy
 Commemoration of Princess Chulabhorn Walailak, the researcher princess
 the 72nd anniversary of National Cooperatives
 the 36th anniversary of Crown Prince Vajiralongkorn
 the centenary of Siriraj Hospital
 the 72nd anniversary of Chulalongkorn University
 the 90th anniversary of Princess Mother Srinagarindra
 the centenary of the Siriraj Pattayakorn School
 the centenary of the Comptroller General's Department
 the 36th anniversary of Princess Sirindhorn
 the centenary of Prince Mahidol Adulyadej
 the 80th anniversary of Thai Scouting
 Commemoration of Princess Mother Srinagarindra for her public health work
 the centenary of the Ministry of Interior
 the centenary of the Ministry of Justice
 Ramon Magsaysay Award: Public Service to Princess Sirindhorn
 the 60th anniversary of the National Assembly of Thailand
 the 5th cycle birthday of the Queen Sirikit
 the centenary of Ministry of Agriculture and Cooperatives
 the 64th anniversary of King Bhumipol Adulyadej at the same age as King Mongkut
 the 50th anniversary of the Bank of Thailand
 the 60th anniversary of the Treasury Department
 the centenary of Thai Teacher Education
 the centenary of the Thai Red Cross Society
 the centenary of the Office of Attorney General
 the centenary of  King Prajadhipok
 the 60th anniversary of the Royal Institute
 the 60th anniversary of Thammasat Universary
 the 120th anniversary of the Privy Council and the Council of State
 the centenary of Thai Nursing
 the 50th anniversary of the Food and Agriculture Organization (FAO)
 Commemoration of the Year of ASEAN Environment
 Commemoration of the Year of Thailand's Information Technology
 the 50th anniversary celebrations of the King Bhumibol Adulyadej's accession

References 

 The Treasury Department. Annual Report, Bangkok, 2005.
 The Treasury Department. Annual Report, Bangkok, 2006.
 The Treasury Department. Annual Report, Bangkok, 2007.

See also 
 Thai baht

Coins of Thailand
Two-base-unit coins